Cal Ribot  is a house located at Avinguda del Pessebre, Engordany, Escaldes-Engordany
Parish, Andorra. It is a heritage property registered in the Cultural Heritage of Andorra.

References

Escaldes-Engordany
Houses in Andorra
Cultural Heritage of Andorra